Club San Cirano is an Argentine rugby union and field hockey club from Villa Celina, Greater Buenos Aires. The rugby team currently plays in Primera División A, the second division of the URBA league system.

History
In 1971, the Asociación de Ex alumnos del Colegio San Cirano was created as a social club by former pupils of San Cirano College in Buenos Aires, being named Brian Healy as its first president. Two years later, the association became a sports club and changed its name to Club San Cirano which remains nowadays. The main sport played at the club has always been rugby union, registering San Cirano with the Unión de Rugby de Buenos Aires in July 1973. In 1974 a field hockey section opened and the club registered with the Asociación Amateur Argentina de Hockey sobre Césped.

San Cirano has the particularity of having won the national title without ever winning a provincial title. In 1998, San Cirano reached the final of the Nacional de Clubes and drew with San Luis, hence sharing the title. It also has a great group of fans called "LA 36".

Today the club is mostly competitive at underage levels and has become one of the best rugby academies in Buenos Aires. In 2011, San Cirano came back to the higher category of the URBA.

Titles
Nacional de Clubes (1): 1998
Sudamericano (1) 1999

References

External links
Official website 

s
s
s
s